The following is the complete list of performances by American actress, singer, and producer Kristen Bell.

Films

Television

Video games

Web series

Music videos

Theatre

Discography

References

External links
 

Bell, Kristen
Bell, Kristen